Re Blue Arrow plc [1987] BCLC 585 is a UK company law case dealing with unfair prejudice under s 459 Companies Act 1985 (now s 994 Companies Act 2006).

Facts
Mrs Watson-Challis was in the recruitment agency business. Between 1956 and 1982 she had built up a variety of businesses. In business she went by the pseudonym of "Sheila Birch". Then she met Mr Berry. They were impressed by each other's business talents and decided to set up a new company. She transferred her business and shareholdings to the new firm, Blue Arrow, in which she took a 45% stake. Mr Berry took a 55% stake. Blue Arrow had a variety of subsidiaries. Mrs Watson-Challis was the executive director of the subsidiaries and the "president" of the parent, while Mr Berry was the chairman. By 1984, Mrs Watson-Challis was travelling overseas, and no longer taking an active part of the company's affairs. The company was floated, it went public. Over time, with many others buying up new share offerings, her percentage of the shareholding went down to 2.1%. She resigned her directorships, but her position as "president" remained written into the company's constitution, the articles of association. Then she decided she wanted to come back. The management resisted, and they resolved to alter the company's articles so that she could be removed from her position as president. She petitioned the court that such action was "unfairly prejudicial" because she had a legitimate expectation to participate in the company's affairs.

Judgment
Vinelott J refused to grant relief to the petitioner. An alleged agreement that she should remain as the chairman was not looked on favourably in this public company, because it contradicts the principle that in public companies information material to good governance should be disclosed to shareholders. Investors are entitled to assume that the whole of the company's constitution is written in the constitution (not some existential "legitimate expectation"). Particularly, the right to be the company president was a personal right (not a class right) and it could be altered by special resolution. Vinelott J stated,

See also
UK company law

Notes

United Kingdom company case law
1987 in case law
1987 in British law
High Court of Justice cases